Varian Lonamei (born May 10, 1962) is a member of the National Parliament of Solomon Islands. He represents a constituency from Isabel Province, and currently serves as the Minister for Aviation, Communication and Meteorology for the Solomon Islands. He received a degree in commerce from Papua New Guinea University of Technology.

References
Member page at Parliament website

1962 births
Living people
Members of the National Parliament of the Solomon Islands
People from Isabel Province
Communication ministers of the Solomon Islands